"I Want You" is the title track from the album I Want You, written by Steven Gordon,  released as its first single by freestyle singer Shana in 1989. It is her most successful single, reaching No. 40 on the Billboard Hot 100 singles chart in the United States and No. 5 on the dance chart in Canada.

Track listing

Charts

References

1989 debut singles
Shana (singer) songs
1989 songs